Michele Denise Hotten (born April 20, 1954) is a Justice of the Supreme Court of Maryland appointed by Larry Hogan.

Biography

The first in her immediate family to attend college, Hotten received her Bachelor of Arts from the University of South Florida in 1975 and her Juris Doctor from the Howard University School of Law in 1979.

Hotten served as a Circuit Court judge in Prince George's for 16 years and spent one year as a District Court judge. She worked as an assistant state's attorney in Prince George's and served as deputy people's zoning counsel and as a hearing examiner for the county Board of Education. She also has worked in private practice.

She was previously a judge on the Maryland Court of Special Appeals. She was appointed to that court by Governor Martin O'Malley on July 23, 2010, to fill the vacancy left by James Salmon.

Maryland Court of Appeals service

On December 1, 2015, Governor Larry Hogan appointed Hotten to fill the vacancy left by the retirement of Judge Glenn T. Harrell Jr. She was sworn into office on December 22, 2015.

At the time of her appointment, she was the fifth woman on the seven-judge panel, which has the highest number of women the court has ever had. She also was the second African American woman appointed to the court, after Judge Shirley M. Watts, who was appointed prior to her.

Personal life

Hotten grew up poor in Southeast Washington, raised by a single mother who often worked three jobs to make ends meet.

See also 
 List of African-American jurists

References

External links
Official Biography on Maryland Court of Appeals

1954 births
Living people
African-American judges
Howard University School of Law alumni
Judges of the Maryland Court of Appeals
People from Washington, D.C.
University of South Florida alumni
21st-century American judges
Maryland Court of Special Appeals judges
21st-century American women judges
21st-century African-American women
21st-century African-American people
20th-century African-American people
20th-century African-American women